Cassville is a city in Flat Creek Township, Barry County, Missouri, United States. According to the 2020 census, the population of Cassville was 3,190. Cassville is one of the primary markets and job centers for an estimated 14,000 people living in the surrounding area. It is the county seat of Barry County.

History
The land which would be called Cassville was platted in 1845. A post office was set up the same year. The community was named after Lewis Cass, a former United States Senator and Secretary of War. Cassville was incorporated on March 3, 1847.

A group of Cherokee were forced along the northern route of the Trail of Tears. During this forced march, they stopped in Cassville, Missouri, an unchartered small settlement of less than a dozen early Southwest Missouri pioneer families.  The group arrived on March 24, 1839 and camped at Lee Spring (at the South end of the Greenway and Aquatic Park) while their military escorts camped at McMurtry Spring (on Hwy. 37 just South of Hwy. 37/76 intersection).

Cassville served as the Confederate capital of Missouri for one week from October 31 to November 7, 1861. This ended abruptly when the duly elected governor of the State, Claiborne F. Jackson, and his political and military allies were pushed further south by the invading Union army. The Battle of Pea Ridge later secured Missouri for the Union.

The city was connected by rail via the Cassville & Exeter Railroad from July 4, 1896 to September 11, 1956.

The Cassville Ranger Station Historic District, Natural Bridge Archaeological Site, and six sites in Roaring River State Park are listed on the National Register of Historic Places.

Demographics

2010 census
As of the census of 2010, there were 3,266 people, 1,275 households, and 848 families living in the city. The racial makeup of the city was 93.8% White, 0.4% African American, 1.7% Native American, 0.3% Asian, 2.1% from other races, and 1.8% from two or more races. Hispanic or Latino of any race were 4.6% of the population.

There were 1,275 households, of which 34.2% had children under the age of 18 living with them, 48.9% were married couples living together, 13.1% had a female householder with no husband present, 4.5% had a male householder with no wife present, and 33.5% were non-families. 30.0% of all households were made up of individuals, and 16% had someone living alone who was 65 years of age or older. The average household size was 2.43 and the average family size was 2.99.

The median age in the city was 40.5 years. 23.8% of residents were under the age of 18; 8.4% were between the ages of 18 and 24; 23% were from 25 to 44; 25.3% were from 45 to 64; and 19.3% were 65 years of age or older. The gender makeup of the city was 46.8% male and 53.2% female.

2000 census
As of the census of 2000, there were 2,890 people, 1,194 households, and 770 families living in the city. The population density was 1,046.0 people per square mile (404.3/km2). There were 1,307 housing units at an average density of 473.0 per square mile (182.8/km2). The racial makeup of the city was 96.30% White, 0.03% African American, 0.73% Native American, 0.69% Asian, 1.11% from other races, and 1.14% from two or more races. Hispanic or Latino of any race were 2.63% of the population.

There were 1,194 households, out of which 30.2% had children under the age of 18 living with them, 50.1% were married couples living together, 10.9% had a female householder with no husband present, and 35.5% were non-families. 31.7% of all households were made up of individuals, and 15.7% had someone living alone who was 65 years of age or older. The average household size was 2.35 and the average family size was 2.95.

In the city, the population was spread out, with 25.5% under the age of 18, 8.2% from 18 to 24, 26.4% from 25 to 44, 21.7% from 45 to 64, and 18.2% who were 65 years of age or older. The median age was 38 years. For every 100 females, there were 90.3 males. For every 100 females age 18 and over, there were 85.8 males.

The median income for a household in the city was $27,351, and the median income for a family was $34,074. Males had a median income of $22,952 versus $19,120 for females. The per capita income for the city was $16,660. About 12.3% of families and 15.4% of the population were below the poverty line, including 21.4% of those under age 18 and 12.4% of those age 65 or over.

Government
The City of Cassville is managed by four-member Board of Aldermen (City Council) with Bill Shiveley serving as the Mayor. Steve Walensky serves at City Administrator. Steve Walensky has been the City Administrator for the City of Cassville since September 2016.  Prior to that, he was the Director of Public Works, a role he took on in 2011.

Education
Cassville R-IV School District operates one elementary school, one middle school, one intermediate school, and Cassville High School.

Cassville has a public library, a branch of the Barry-Lawrence Regional Library.

Crowder College offers two-year degree programs in Cassville.

Since August 2022 the Cassville school uses corporal punishment again.

Transportation
The city owns a small general aviation airport two miles northwest of Cassville, named the Cassville Municipal Airport.

Notable people
 Clete Boyer - Major League Baseball player born in Cassville
 Mary Easley - Oklahoma Senator (2004-2010), Oklahoma Representative (1997-2004), teacher
 Curtis F. Marbut - Director of the Soil Survey Division of the U.S. Department of Agriculture
 Scott Fitzpatrick - Missouri State Treasurer, graduate of Cassville High School

Geography
Located in the Ozarks, Cassville and its surrounding area have a densely forested hilly terrain. The city, itself, sits on Flat Creek. Located south of Cassville, Roaring River State Park is a popular recreation spot for hiking, fishing, and camping.

Climate
Climate in this area is characterized by relatively high temperatures and evenly distributed precipitation throughout the year.  The Köppen Climate Classification subtype for this climate is "Cfa" (Humid Subtropical Climate).

References

External links
 City of Cassville
 Chamber of Commerce
 Historic maps of Cassville in the Sanborn Maps of Missouri Collection at the University of Missouri

Cities in Barry County, Missouri
County seats in Missouri
Cities in Missouri
1845 establishments in Missouri
Populated places established in 1845